Events in the year 2017 in Kuwait.

Incumbents
Emir: Sabah Al-Ahmad Al-Jaber Al-Sabah 
Prime Minister: Jaber Al-Mubarak Al-Hamad Al-Sabah

Events

Deaths

4 January – Hisham Al-Otaibi, politician (b. 1946).
3 August – Souad Al-Humaidhi, businesswoman (b. 1939).
11 August – Abdulhussain Abdulredha, actor (b. 1939).

References

 
2010s in Kuwait
Years of the 21st century in Kuwait
Kuwait
Kuwait